The 1987–88 OB I bajnokság season was the 51st season of the OB I bajnokság, the top level of ice hockey in Hungary. Seven teams participated in the league, and Ujpesti Dozsa SC won the championship.

Regular season

Playoffs

5th place 
 Dunaújvárosi Kohász - Jászberényi Lehel SE 2:7/1:7

3rd place 
 Alba Volán Székesfehérvár - Miskolci Kinizsi 2:0/6:2

Final
 Újpesti Dózsa SC - Ferencvárosi TC 2:1 (2:1, 4:5, 7:0)

External links
 Season on hockeyarchives.info

1987
Hun
OB